José María Luis Mora Lamadrid (12 October 1794, Chamacuero, Guanajuato – 14 July 1850, Paris, France) was a priest, lawyer, historian, politician and liberal ideologist. Considered one of the first supporters of liberalism in Mexico, he fought for the separation of church and state. Mora has been deemed  "the most significant liberal spokesman for his generation [and] his thought epitomizes the structure and the predominant orientation of Mexican liberalism."

Early life 
Born in 1794 during Spanish colonial rule of Mexico, Mora came from a prosperous American-born Spanish (criollo) family from the Guanajuato.  His family lost its wealth during the 1810 revolt of Father Miguel Hidalgo, but Mora gained access to the prestigious ex-Jesuit academy of Colegio de San Ildefonso in Mexico City, where he studied theology. In 1820 he received his doctorate and ordination to the priesthood. He was a faculty member at the colegio and also served as librarian. He became a deacon in the archbishopric of Mexico, the seat of ecclesiastical power, but did not rise in the hierarchy. Blocked from advance within the Catholic Church, he turned in 1821 to secular political matters, becoming a journalist and following Mexican independence in September 1821, a liberal politician shaping the newly sovereign state.  In 1823 Mora advocated for the curricular reform of San Ildefonso to emphasize more modern approaches to learning in Spanish, rather than rote memorization and emphasis on Latin.

Career 
After the proclamation of the republic in Mexico in 1824, he was one of the drafters of the Constitution of the State of Mexico and was a member of the state congress. He criticized the Mexican Constitution of 1824 as incoherent and because it protected Roman Catholicism as the sole religion rather than allowing for religious freedom. He opposed the expulsion of Spaniards in Mexico, and used the newspaper he edited, El Observador, funded by the wealthy Fagoaga family to support the post-independence presence of Spaniards in Mexico.  As a journalist, he advocated for the Scottish Rite Masons. He was an opponent of the populist former insurgent leader Vicente Guerrero, who came to power in 1829, and therefore supported the coup of Anastasio Bustamante to oust Guerrero from the presidency. However, when Bustamante became a military dictator, Mora opposed him too.

Mora's principal writings date from the 1820s. Mora's main sources of inspiration were initially John Locke and Benjamin Constant and later Gaspar Melchor de Jovellanos. In Benjamin Constant, Mora saw a thinker who in post-revolutionary France sought to guarantee the rights of the individual against the strength of popular sovereignty, which he opposed because it led to the bloody excesses of the French Revolution, favoring instead a Constitutionalist system. Within such a system the most important individual freedoms were protected from both the government and the whims of the masses. Mora initially saw giving political power to Mexican property-holders as a safe guard to personal liberty, but then realized that their vested interests allied them with the Church and the largely conservative Mexican army. Those interest groups were opposed to reform, so that Mora increasingly saw the use force against them as necessary. The centralizing policies of the Spanish state during the eighteenth-century Bourbon monarchy led Mora to take inspiration from Jovellanos. Historian Charles A. Hale contends that Mora's drive to use the strong state to effect reform undermined basic tenets of liberal thought such as individual rights and laissez-faire.

Owing to ongoing political unrest Mora became disillusioned with constitutionalism and therefore increasingly focused his sights on breaking the privileged position of the Roman Church and the army. Both for fiscal and ideological reasons, he was in favor of expropriating the property of the Roman Catholic Church, which controlled but did not utilize the land it owned. Mora wanted to continue reducing the privileged position of the Church in the constitution, and he sought religious freedom and secular education as well. When legislation to limit the power of the Church was defeated in 1831, the governor of Zacatecas state held an essay contest with a prize of 2,000 pesos, with contestants to write on the topic of government's right to expropriate church property, a contest Mora won.

Mora supported vice president Valentín Gómez Farías, who was Antonio López de Santa Anna's running mate. Since Santa Anna had no interest in actually serving as president, Gómez Farías was effectively in power and initiated a reform program. Gómez Farías appointed Mora to reform education, and Mora opened the first secular school in Mexico City. However, Conservatives and the military, led by Antonio López de Santa Anna, opposed the Gómez Farías reform program and forced the vice president to resign in early 1834.

As a result, Mora went in self-exile to live in Paris, but he continued to comment on the political events in his homeland. In 1844 President José Joaquín de Herrera appointed him ambassador to the United Kingdom. In 1846, after returning to power, President Gómez Farías asked Mora to return to Mexico, but Mora was prevented by the Mexican–American War. The war shocked Mora, who admired the American political system. Even in 1848, after the war, he was not able to return to Mexico due to health issues, especially tuberculosis. He died on the French national holiday (July 14), 1850.

In exile, Mora began writing what was envisioned to be a four-volume history of Mexico. In it, he articulated particular views on Mexico's past with relevance to the current political situation.  He was an opponent of all forms of demagoguery but saw the 1810 uprising of Father Miguel Hidalgo that sparked the Mexican War of Independence as a necessary evil.

Works 

 Memoria que para informar sobre el origen y stado actual de las obras emprendidas para el desagüe de las lagunas del valle de México. Mexico 1823.
 A los habitantes del estado de México su congreso constituyente. Texcoco 1827.
 Catecismo político de la federación mexicana. Mexico 1831
 Disertación sobre la naturaleza y aplicación de las rentas y bienes eclesiásticas, y sobre la autoridad a que se hallan sujetos en cuanto a su creación, aumento, sustencia o supresión. Mexico 1833.
 Méjico y sus revoluciones. 3 vols. Paris 1836.
 Obras sueltas, 2nd edition. Mexico: Porrúa 1963.

Legacy 
Compared to Mora's contemporary, Lucas Alamán, the chief conservative spokesman and prolific writer, Mora produced a slim output of works. He ceased writing in 1837, with the publication of his history of Mexico.  But Mora's ideas would later be followed by a generation of liberal politicians who, during the Liberal Reform following the ouster of conservative Santa Anna, changed the face of Mexico dramatically. There is a museum in his hometown of Chamacuero (today Comonfort, Guanajuato ), in what was his home town. His remains were moved to the Rotunda of Illustrious Persons on June 24 of 1963.

Further reading 

 Arnaiz y Freg, Arturo. "El Dr. José María Luis Mora, 1794-1859," Memoria de la Academia Mexicana de la Historia 25, no 4 (1966) 405–525.
 Chávez Orozco, Luis. La gestión diplomática del doctor Mora. Mexico City: Porrúa 1970.
 Costeloe, Michael. La primera república federal de México 1824–1835: Un estudio de los partidos políticos en el México independiente. Mexico City: Fondo de Cultura Económica 1975.
 Costeloe, Michael. "Una curiosidad histórica: las primeras reseñas de las Obras Sueltas de José María Luis Mora 1839," Historia Mexiana, vol. 37, no. 3 (Jan–Mar 1988), pp. 523–536.
 Espejo de discordias: La sociedad mexicana vista por Lorenzo de Zavala, José María Luis Mora, y Lucas Alamán. Mexico City: Secretaría de Educación Pública 1984.
 Gringoire, Pedro. "El 'Protestantismo' del Dr. Mora," Historia Mexicana 3 (1953) 328–366.
 Hale, Charles A. "José María Luis Mora and the Structure of Mexican Liberalism," Hispanic American Historical Review 45 (1965) 196–227.
 Hale, Charles A. Mexican Liberalism in the Age of Mora, 1821–1853. New Haven: Yale University Press 1968.
 Mena, Mario. Un clérigo anticlerical: El Doctor Mora. Mexico 1958.
 Obregón, T. E.. (1919). "Factors in the Historical Evolution of Mexico," The Hispanic American Historical Review, 2(2), 135–172. Factors in the Historical Evolution of Mexico
 Padilla Dromundo, Jorge, El pensamiento económica del doctor José María Luis Mora. Mexico City: Instituto Tecnológico Autónoma de México 1986.
 Rojas, Rafael. "Mora en  morsMoraParís (1834–1850): Un liberal en el exilio, un diplomático ante la guerra," Historia Mexicana vol. 62, No. 1 (Jul.-Sep. 2012) pp. 7–57.
 Schroeder, Susan. "Father José María Luis Mora, Liberalism, and the British and Foreign Bible Society in Nineteenth-Century Mexico" The Americas, Vol. 50, No. 3 (Jan., 1994), pp. 377–397.

References

External sources 
 El clero de hace casi dos siglos a la luz del presente
 14 de julio de 1850. - Muerte de don José María Luis Mora, político e historiador.
 Presentacion de Chantal Lopez y Omar Cortes a la edicion cibernetica del Catecismo politico de la Federacion Mexicana de Jose Maria Luis Mora, Captura y diseño, Chantal Lopez y Omar Cortes para la Biblioteca Virtual Antorcha
 Antología de José María Luis Mora | PDF | Principios éticos | Gobierno
 Autores: José María Luis Mora
 Archivo de José María Luis Mora

19th-century Mexican politicians
People from Comonfort
19th-century Mexican Roman Catholic priests
1794 births
1850 deaths
19th-century Mexican historians
Historians of Mexico
Liberalism in Mexico